Lilliu is a surname. Notable people with the surname include:

Giovanni Lilliu (1914–2012), Italian archeologist, academician, publicist, and politician
Nyco Lilliu (born 1987), French singer, brother of Pierrick
Pierrick Lilliu (born 1986), French singer